Keppel TatLee Bank was a Singapore-based financial services organisation formed through a merger of Keppel Bank and Tat Lee Bank on 26 December 1998. It was acquired by Oversea-Chinese Banking Corporation (OCBC) in August 2001 and was integrated into OCBC Bank in 2002.

History
The bank was formed on 26 December 1998 when Keppel Bank acquired another Singapore financial institution, Tat Lee Bank. Keppel Bank was formed in 1990, when Keppel Corporation acquired the Asia Commercial Bank.

The bank formed a strategic alliance with Allied Irish Banks in 1999, which allowed AIB to take up a 24.9% stake in the bank. In 2001, the bank was privatised and became a subsidiary of Keppel Capital Holdings Ltd (KCH), as part of a restructure of KCH. Its parent company was then acquired by OCBC, operationally and legally integrated with it in 2002.

References

2002 disestablishments in Singapore
Banks established in 1998
Banks disestablished in 2002
Defunct banks of Singapore
Allied Irish Banks
Singaporean brands
Singaporean companies established in 1998